The 1969 BRSCC British Saloon Car Championship, was the twelfth season of the championship. The title was won by Alec Poole in a Mini Cooper S.

Teams & Drivers

Calendar & Winners
All races were held in the United Kingdom. Overall winners in bold.

Dead heat.

Championship results

References

British Touring Car Championship seasons
Saloon